Daniel Jesus Moreira Carvalho (born 13 October 1995 in) simply Dani Carvalho, is a Portuguese footballer who plays for Fafe as a goalkeeper.

Football career
On 4 November 2015, Dani made his professional debut with Freamunde in a 2015–16 Segunda Liga match against Feirense.

References

External links

Stats and profile at LPFP 

1995 births
People from Paredes, Portugal
Living people
Portuguese footballers
Association football goalkeepers
Liga Portugal 2 players
S.C. Freamunde players
U.S.C. Paredes players
AD Fafe players
Sportspeople from Porto District